Gillian Honorine Mary Herbert, Baroness Hemingford,  (née Bliss; 29 April 1937 – 18 October 2020), known professionally as Jill Paton Walsh, was an English novelist and children's writer. She may be known best for her Booker Prize-nominated novel Knowledge of Angels and for the Peter Wimsey–Harriet Vane mysteries that continued the work of Dorothy L. Sayers.

Personal life
Gillian Honorine Mary Bliss was born on 29 April 1937 to John Bliss, an engineer for the BBC who at his death had 363 patents to his name, and Patricia Paula DuBern, a homemaker. She went with her mother and siblings to live with grandparents in St. Ives, Cornwall, when she was three years old because of the World War II bombings. In 1944, after the grandmother had died, Bliss returned to London to live with her mother and her younger siblings, who had returned to London earlier. Bliss was educated at St. Michael's Convent, North Finchley, London. She attended St. Anne's College, Oxford, graduating in 1959, and lived in Cambridge.

After graduating, Bliss taught English at Enfield County Grammar School for Girls, but left her position in 1962, as she was expecting her first child. The year before, in 1961, she had married Antony Edmund Paton Walsh; they settled in Richmond, south-west London, and had one son and two daughters. 

In the early 1970s, Jill met John Rowe Townsend and they began an affair. She left her first husband only in 1986, when their youngest daughter turned 18. 

Antony did not want a divorce because of his Roman Catholic faith. Jill and Townsend were married only in 2004, after Antony's death on 30 December 2003. Townsend died in 2014. 

In February 2020, she met Nicholas Herbert, 3rd Baron Hemingford (1934−2022), whom she married in September of that year. She died three weeks later, in October, of kidney and heart failure in hospital at Huntingdon, Cambridgeshire.

Honours
In 1996, Paton Walsh received the CBE for services to literature and was elected a Fellow of the Royal Society of Literature. In 1998, she won the Phoenix Award from the Children's Literature Association, recognising A Chance Child as the best children's book published twenty years earlier that did not win a major award.

On writing for children

In an essay on realism in children's literature, Paton Walsh stated that realism (like fantasy) is also metaphorical, and that she would like the relationship between the reader and her characters Bill and Julie in Fireweed to be as metaphorical as that between "dragons and the reader's greed or courage".

Works

Knowledge of Angels (1993), a medieval philosophical novel, was shortlisted for the 1994 Booker Prize. Other adult novels include:
 Farewell, Great King (1972)
 Lapsing (1986), about Catholic university students
 A School for Lovers (1989), reworking of the plot of Mozart's Cosi fan tutte
 The Serpentine Cave (1997), based on a lifeboat disaster in St Ives
 A Desert in Bohemia (2000), which follows a group of characters in England and in an imaginary Eastern European country through the years between World War II and 1989

Imogen Quy
Paton Walsh wrote four detective stories that featured part-time college nurse Imogen Quy, and were set in the fictional St. Agatha's College, University of Cambridge: 
 The Wyndham Case (1993)
 A Piece of Justice (1995)
 Debts of Dishonour (2006)
 The Bad Quarto (2007)

Lord Peter Wimsey
In 1998, she completed Dorothy L. Sayers's unfinished Lord Peter Wimsey–Harriet Vane novel, Thrones, Dominations. In 2002, she followed this up with another Lord Peter novel, A Presumption of Death. In 2010, she published a third, The Attenbury Emeralds. Her last addition to the series, The Late Scholar, was published 5 December 2013 in the UK, and 14 January 2014 in North America.

Children's books

 Hengest's Tale (St Martin's Press, 1966), fiction, illustrated by Janet Margrie
 The Dolphin Crossing (1967), adapted for the stage by Ed Viney (2012)
 Word Hoard: Anglo-Saxon stories (1969?), by Paton Walsh and Kevin Crossley-Holland 
 Fireweed (1969)
 Goldengrove (1972)
 The Dawnstone (1973) Published by Hamish Hamilton
 Toolmaker (1973), picture book illus. Jeroo Roy
 The Emperor's Winding Sheet —Whitbread Prize for children's books, 1974
 The Butty Boy (1975), illus. Juliette Palmer
 The Huffler (1975), illus. Palmer
 The Island Sunrise: prehistoric Britain (1975); US subtitle, —nonfiction
 Unleaving (1976), sequel to Goldengrove —Boston Globe–Horn Book Award for fiction, 1976
 Crossing to Salamis (1977), picture book illus. David Smee
 The Walls of Athens (1977), picture book illus. Smee
 A Chance Child (1978)
 Children of the Fox (1978), illus. Robin Eaton
 The Green Book (1981), illus. Lloyd Bloom
 Babylon (1982)
 A Parcel of Patterns (1983)
 Gaffer Samson's Luck (1984) —Smarties Prize, 1985 
 Birdy and the Ghosties (1989)
 Grace (1991)
 When Grandma Came (1992), picture book illus. by Sophy Williams
 Thomas and the Tinners'' (1995) — 1995 Carnegie Medal longlist

Bibliography
 With foreword by Jill Paton Walsh.

References

External links 
 
  with biography and complete bibliography to 2001
 
 

1937 births
2020 deaths
English children's writers
English mystery writers
20th-century English novelists
21st-century English novelists
Hemingford
Commanders of the Order of the British Empire
Fellows of the Royal Society of Literature
People educated at St. Michael's Catholic Grammar School
Alumni of St Anne's College, Oxford
Women mystery writers
English women novelists
21st-century English women writers
20th-century English women writers
Writers from London